Alberto Berasategui was the defending champion, but lost in first round to qualifier Magnus Norman.

Francisco Clavet won the title by defeating Jordi Burillo 6–7(2–7), 6–3, 7–6(7–1) in the final.

Seeds

Draw

Finals

Top half

Bottom half

References

External links
 Official results archive (ATP)
 Official results archive (ITF)

Campionati Internazionali di Sicilia
1995 ATP Tour
Camp